AG Carinae (AG Car) is a star in the constellation Carina. It is classified as a luminous blue variable (LBV) and is one of the most luminous stars in the Milky Way. The great distance (20,000 light-years) and intervening dust mean that the star is not usually visible to the naked eye; its apparent brightness varies erratically between magnitude 5.7 and 9.0.

Description

The star is surrounded by a nebula of ejected material at 0.4–1.2 pc from the star. There is an 8.8-parsec-wide empty cavity in the interstellar medium around the star, presumably cleared by fast winds earlier in the star's life.

AG Carinae is apparently in a transitional phase between a massive class O blue supergiant and a Wolf–Rayet star, where it is highly unstable and suffers from erratic pulsations, occasional larger outbursts, and rare massive eruptions. The spectral type varies between WN11 at visual minimum and an early A hypergiant at maximum.

One study calculated that the bolometric luminosity of AG Carinae decreases during its S Doradus-type outbursts, unlike most LBVs which remain at approximately constant luminosity.

Evolutionary models of the star suggest that it had a low rotation rate for much of its life, but current observations show fairly rapid rotation.

Models of LBV progenitors of type IIb supernovae list AG Carinae as matching the final stellar spectrum prior to core collapse, although the models are for stars with 20 to 25 times the mass of the Sun while AG Carinae is thought to be considerably more massive.

Distance controversy
Parallaxes from data release 1 (DR1) of the Gaia mission suggest a much closer distance to AG Carinae and its neighbour Hen 3-519 than previously accepted, around 2,000 pc. Then both stars would be less luminous than LBVs and it is argued that they would be former red supergiants whose unusual characteristics are the result of binary evolution.

The earlier Hipparcos parallax for AG Carinae had a margin of error larger than the parallax itself and so gave little information about its distance. The distance of 6,000 pc is based on assumptions about the properties of LBVs, models of interstellar extinction, and kinematical measurements. The Gaia team recommend that a further 0.3 mas systematic error is allowed for (i.e. added to the formal margin of error).

Gallery

Notes

References

External links
 2MASS Atlas Image Gallery: Miscellaneous Objects includes an infrared image of AG Carinae
 Hubble Space Telescope zooms to AG Carinae YouTube

Carina (constellation)
Luminous blue variables
Carinae, AG
094910
053461
CD-59 03430
Wolf–Rayet stars
A-type hypergiants